Squirrel Nut Zippers is an American swing and jazz band formed in 1993 in Chapel Hill, North Carolina, by James "Jimbo" Mathus (vocals and guitar), Tom Maxwell (vocals and guitar), Katharine Whalen (vocals, banjo, ukulele), Chris Phillips (drums), Don Raleigh (bass guitar), and Ken Mosher.

The band's music is a fusion of Delta blues, gypsy jazz, 1930s–era swing, klezmer, and other styles. They found commercial success during the swing revival of the late 1990s with their 1996 single "Hell", written by Tom Maxwell. After a hiatus of several years, the original band members reunited and performed in 2007, playing in the U.S. and Canada.

In 2016, Mathus and Phillips reunited the band with a new lineup to tour in support of the 20th anniversary of their highest selling album, Hot.

The Squirrel Nut Zippers continue to tour, and released their new album Beasts of Burgundy in March 2018, and singles "Mardi Gras for Christmas" and "Alone at Christmas" in November 2018.

History

Swing revival
The band was founded by James "Jimbo" Mathus, formerly of Metal Flake Mother and Johnny Vomit & The Dry Heaves, and his then-wife Katharine Whalen in Carrboro, North Carolina, with Tom Maxwell, Chris Phillips, Don Raleigh, and Ken Mosher. The group made its debut in Chapel Hill a few months later. Stacy Guess (formerly of Pressure Boys) joined shortly after.

"Nut Zippers" is a southern term for a variety of old bootleg moonshine. The band's name comes from a newspaper story about an intoxicated man who climbed a tree and refused to come down even after police arrived. The headline was "Squirrel Nut Zipper." It is also the name of a caramel and peanut candy dating back to 1890.

The band is credited for contributing to the swing revival that occurred during the 1990s. The band was influenced by Johnny Ace, Cab Calloway, Django Reinhardt, Raymond Scott, Fats Waller, and Tom Waits. The breakthrough single "Hell", with its calypso rhythm, more closely aligned the band with the neo-swing movement.

The Zippers's debut album, The Inevitable (1995), received airplay on National Public Radio, and its second album, Hot (1996), was certified platinum. Hot was also one of the first enhanced CDs, containing an interactive presentation created by filmmaker Clay Walker. In support of the album, the band toured with rock singer Neil Young. Perennial Favorites (1998) followed, then Christmas Caravan and Bedlam Ballroom.

The Squirrel Nut Zippers performed at the 1996 Summer Olympics in Atlanta and at President Clinton's second inaugural ball. Their numerous appearances included such notables as the radio show  Prairie Home Companion and on television shows The Tonight Show, Late Show with David Letterman, Conan O'Brien, and Dick Clark's New Year's Rockin' Eve.

Zippers unzipped
By the early 2000s, the Zippers were inactive. Mathus and Katharine Whalen had divorced, and the band members went their separate ways.

Whalen released her debut album, Katharine Whalen's Jazz Squad.  Mathus toured and recorded extensively with Buddy Guy and has released 18 solo records on various labels, and under various names, while keeping a hand in numerous other projects.  Je Widenhouse and Reese Gray recorded and toured with Firecracker Jazz Band. Chris Phillips spent two years with the Dickies and William Reid from the Jesus and Mary Chain. His band The Lamps included members of the Bangles and The Connells.

Reunions
In early 2007, the band's official website announced tour dates with a lineup consisting of Jimbo Mathus, Katharine Whalen, Chris Phillips, Je Widenhouse, Stuart Cole, and Will Dawson. With the proclamation "Ladies and Gentlemen...They're Back," the band performed concert dates throughout the U.S. and Canada in the spring and summer of 2007 and through 2008.

In late February 2009, Phillips sent an e-mail announcing a forthcoming live album called You Are My Radio, recorded in Brooklyn in December 2008. The album title was later changed to Lost at Sea and was released on October 27 through Southern Broadcasting/MRI. They also announced plans for a studio album in 2010. The band taped a performance for NPR's Mountain Stage, which aired in mid-November.

Following renewed interest at the approach of the 20th Anniversary of Hot, Mathus began assembling a revival band, focusing on musicians in the New Orleans area.  They began touring in June 2016, with the initial line-up including Mathus, Dr. Sick (fiddle, vocals), Ingrid Lucia (vocals), Kris Tokarski (piano), Charlie Halloran (trombone), Dave Boswell (trumpet), Henry Westmoreland (saxophone), Tamara Nicolai (upright bass) and Kevin O’Donnell (drums), with original Zippers drummer Chris Phillips managing, and Alex Holeman as road manager.

The band has continued to tour; a new studio album, Beasts of Burgundy was released March 23, 2018 via their own label Southern Broadcasting. Performers on the album include Mathus (guitar, vocals), Dr. Sick (fiddle, banjo, various instruments, vocals), Cella Blue (vocals), Vanessa Niemann (vocals), Tamar A. Korn (vocals), Dave Boswell (trumpet), Kevin Louis (trumpet), Aurora Nealand (clarinet), Charlie Halloran (trombone), Colin Myers (trombone), Henry Westmoreland (tenor and baritone saxophone), Kris Tokarski (piano), Leslie P. Martin (piano), Tamara Nicolai (upright bass), Neilson Bernard III (drums) and Chris Phillips (percussion).

Discography

Studio albums 
 The Inevitable (1995)
 Hot (1996)
 Perennial Favorites (1998)
 Christmas Caravan (1998)
 Bedlam Ballroom (2000)
 Beasts of Burgundy (2018)
 Lost Songs Of Doc Souchon (2020)

Live albums 
 Lost at Sea (2009)

EPs 
 Roasted Right (1994)
 Sold Out (1997)

Compilations 
 The Best of Squirrel Nut Zippers as Chronicled by Shorty Brown (2002)

Singles

Soundtracks 
As of 2021, music performed by the Squirrel Nut Zippers has appeared in 25 films or television shows.

References

External links
 
 

1993 establishments in North Carolina
2000 disestablishments in North Carolina
2006 establishments in North Carolina
American jazz ensembles
American swing musical groups
Musical groups established in 1993
Musical groups disestablished in 2000
Musical groups from North Carolina
Musical groups from Chapel Hill-Carrboro, North Carolina
Musical groups reestablished in 2006
Musical groups disestablished in 2010
Musical groups reestablished in 2016
Swing revival ensembles
Jazz musicians from North Carolina
Mammoth Records artists
Hollywood Records artists